Kappa Herculis (κ Herculis, abbreviated Kappa Her, κ Her) is an optical double star in the constellation of Hercules. The two components, Kappa Herculis A (Marsic , the traditional name of the system) and B, were 27.3 arc seconds apart in 2000. Based on parallax measurements from the Hipparcos mission, κ Her A is about 113 parsecs (370 light-years) from the Sun and κ Her B is 600 parsecs (2,000 light-years); more recent parallax measurements suggest that B is around 5% more distant than A.

A faint third component Kappa Herculis C is just over 1 arc-minute away.  It is at the same distance as κ Her A and has an almost-identical space motion.

Nomenclature 

κ Herculis (Latinised to Kappa Herculis) is the system's Bayer designation. The designations of the components as Kappa Herculis A, B and C derive from the convention used by the Washington Multiplicity Catalog (WMC) for multiple star systems, and adopted by the International Astronomical Union (IAU).

The system bore the traditional names of "Marsic", "Marfik" or "Marfak", all of which come from the Arabic لمرفق Al-Mirfaq meaning "the elbow", a name (or some derivative of which) it shared with Lambda Ophiuchi. The Working Group on Star Names (WGSN) approved the name Marsic for the component Kappa Herculis A on February 1, 2017, and Marfik for the primary component of Lambda Ophiuchi on September 12, 2016, and they are both now so included in the List of IAU-approved Star Names.

Properties 

Kappa Herculis A is a giant star with stellar classification G8III. Its slightly companion is cooler and about a third of the luminosity.

Kappa Herculis is a suspected variable star with a reported magnitude range of 4.70 to 5.02.

References

External links 
Jim Kaler's Stars, University of Illinois: MARSIC (Kappa Herculis)
Hercules constellation map showing: κ Herculis

Hercules (constellation)
Herculis, Kappa
Marsic
G-type giants
Herculis, 007
079043
145001
6008
BD+77 2964
Suspected variables